Ánna Báttler is the pen name of Ánna Vasílievna Levashóva (born May 16, 1981), a Russian poet, writer, actress, and philanthropist.

Biography
Anna was born to a family of engineers. At the age of 3, her parents divorced. In 1984, Anna and her mother moved to (Germany) where she developed a love of Russian literature and culture that was instilled by her maternal grandmother Dina Dmitrievna (née Novitskaya).

Anna Battler graduated from Lomonosov Moscow State University (MSU) with two degrees in Psychology and Clinical Psychology.

Bibliography
She has published three collections of poetry: To Him, Dark Horse, Without a Dowry.

In September 2015, Anna finished her book entitled Wild Russian Mother. This work described political and social situation in modern Russia, focusing on the public attitude to children and the role of education, the moral decay of Russian society, and the corruption of state officials.

The original text was banned by censorship authorities. However, the edited version of the book was published later.

In 2017, Anna Battler was invited to join the International Union of Writers.

In March 2017, Anna's selected poems from the collection Thank You were broadcast by the Russian radio station Kultura ("Culture").

1981 births
Living people
Moscow State University alumni
Russian actresses
Russian philanthropists
Russian women poets